Officinalis, or officinale, is a Medieval Latin epithet denoting organisms—mainly plants—with uses in medicine, herbalism and cookery. It commonly occurs as a specific epithet, the second term of a two-part botanical name. Officinalis is used to modify masculine and feminine nouns, while officinale is used for neuter nouns.

Etymology
When Linnaeus invented the binomial system of nomenclature, he gave the specific name officinalis, in the 1735 (1st Edition) of his , to plants (and  sometimes animals) with an established medicinal, culinary, or other use.

Species

Althaea officinalis (marshmallow)
Anchusa officinalis (bugloss)
Asparagus officinalis (asparagus)
Avicennia officinalis (mangrove)
Bistorta officinalis (European bistort)
Borago officinalis (borage)
Buddleja officinalis (pale butterflybush)
Calendula officinalis (pot marigold)
Cinchona officinalis (quinine)
Cochlearia officinalis (scurvygrass)
Corallina officinalis (a seaweed)
Cornus officinalis (cornelian cherry)
Cyathula officinalis (ox knee)
Cynoglossum officinale (houndstongue)
Euphrasia officinalis (eyebright)
Fumaria officinalis (fumitory)
Galega officinalis (goat's rue)
Gratiola officinalis (hedge hyssop)
Guaiacum officinale (lignum vitae)
Hyssopus officinalis (hyssop)
Jasminum officinale (jasmine)
Laricifomes officinalis (a wood fungus)
Levisticum officinale (lovage)
Lithospermum officinale (gromwell)
Magnolia officinalis
Melilotus officinalis (ribbed melilot)
Melissa officinalis (lemon balm)
Morinda officinalis (Indian mulberry)
Nasturtium officinale (watercress)
Paeonia officinalis (common paeony)
Parietaria officinalis (upright pellitory)
Pulmonaria officinalis (lungwort)
Rheum officinale (a rhubarb)
Rosa gallica 'Officinalis' (apothecary rose)
Rosmarinus officinalis (rosemary)
Salvia officinalis (sage)
Sanguisorba officinalis (great burnet)
Saponaria officinalis (soapwort)
Scindapsus officinalis (long pepper)
Sepia officinalis (cuttlefish)
Sisymbrium officinale (hedge mustard)
Spongia officinalis (bath sponge)
Stachys officinalis (betony)
Styrax officinalis (drug snowbell)
Symphytum officinale (comfrey)
Taraxacum officinale (dandelion)
Valeriana officinalis (valerian)
Verbena officinalis (vervain)
Veronica officinalis (speedwell)
Zingiber officinale (ginger)

See also
 Sativum or Sativa, the Medieval Latin epithet denoting certain cultivated plants

References

Taxonomy (biology)
Latin biological phrases